Andrew Pataki (August 30, 1927 – December 8, 2011) was an Eastern Catholic hierarch, the second bishop of Parma for the Byzantines, and the third bishop of Passaic for the Byzantines.

Life
Andrew Pataki was born in Palmerton, Pennsylvania, in 1927. He attended elementary school in Palmerton Public Schools and Allentown Central Catholic High School in Allentown. Afterwards, he continued his education at Saint Vincent College in Latrobe. He began studying for the priesthood in 1944, earning a bachelor's degree in philosophy from St. Procopius College-Seminary in Lisle, Illinois, in 1948. He completed his studies at the Byzantine Catholic Seminary of SS. Cyril and Methodius in Pittsburgh and on February 24, 1952, he was ordained a priest by Bishop Daniel Ivancho for the eparchy of Passaic in the seminary chapel.

The newly ordained Father Pataki earned his license in Sacred Theology at the Pontifical Oriental Institute in Rome, after which he was appointed the rector of SS. Cyril and Methodius Seminary. From 1973 until 1978, Pataki served on the Pontifical Commission for the Revision of the Eastern Code of Canon Law; he was also elevated to the rank of a Prelate of Honor by Pope Paul VI.

He was appointed auxiliary bishop of Passaic on June 14, 1983, with the titular see of Telmissus. He was consecrated a bishop on August 23 of the same year. On June 19, 1984, he was appointed the bishop of Parma for the Byzantines, and was installed on August 16, 1985. On November 6, 1995, he would be moved back to the Eparchy of Passaic, this time as its bishop—a post for which he was installed on February 8, 1996.

On December 6, 2007, when he was 80 years of age, Bishop Pataki's request for retirement was accepted by Pope Benedict XVI on account of his having passed the customary retirement age of 75 for Catholic bishops.

References

External links
His Excellency, Most Reverend Andrew Pataki, J.C.L., D.D - The Carpathian Connection

1927 births
2011 deaths
Allentown Central Catholic High School alumni
People from Carbon County, Pennsylvania
Benedictine University alumni
Ruthenian Catholic bishops
American Eastern Catholic bishops
Pontifical Oriental Institute alumni
American people of Hungarian descent